The 2004–05 National Division Two was the fifth version (eighteenth overall) of the third division of the English rugby union league system using the name National Division Two.  New teams to the division included Manchester who were relegated from the 2003–04 National Division One while Waterloo came up as champions of the 2003–04 National Division Three North with Blackheath (champions) and Launceston (playoffs) coming up from the 2003–04 National Division Three South.  Wakefield had also been supposed to join the division having finished 13th in National Division One but sadly due to financial difficulties the club would go into liquidation and cease to exist.  This season would see the league points system being overhauled in the division with four points being awarded for a win, two points for a draw as well as bonus points being introduced (the Premiership had been using them since 2000) with teams being awarded an extra point for scoring four or more tries during a game or if losing, being within seven points of the victor.

Doncaster would finish as league champions, 13 points clear of nearest rivals, Newbury Blues.  Both sides would go up to the 2005–06 National Division One.  At the other end of the table, apart from Rosslyn Park who were comfortably bottom, it was a very tight relegation battle with Bracknell and Nuneaton eventually going down to join Rosslyn Park despite both sides winning their last games - in the end only 2 points separated 10th placed Esher from 12th placed Nuneaton.  Nuneaton would drop down to the 2005–06 National Division Three North while Bracknell and Rosslyn Park went into the 2005–06 National Division Three South.

Participating teams and locations

Final league table

Results

Round 1

Round 2

Round 3

Round 4

Round 5

Round 6

Round 7

Round 8

Round 9

Round 10 

Postponed.  Game rescheduled to 12 February 2005.

Round 11

Round 12

Round 13

Round 14

Round 15

Round 16

Round 17

Round 18

Round 10 (rescheduled game) 

Game rescheduled from 27 November 2004.

Round 19

Round 20

Round 21

Round 22

Round 23

Round 24

Round 25

Round 26

Total season attendances

Individual statistics 

 Note that points scorers includes tries as well as conversions, penalties and drop goals.

Top points scorers

Top try scorers

Season records

Team
Largest home win — 74 pts
79 - 5 Harrogate at home to Bracknell on 27 November 2004
Largest away win — 45 pts
57 - 12 Doncaster away to Wharfedale on 20 4 September 2004
Most points scored — 74 pts
79 - 5 Harrogate at home to Bracknell on 27 November 2004
Most tries in a match — 11
Harrogate at home to Bracknell on 27 November 2004
Most conversions in a match — 9
Harrogate at home to Bracknell on 27 November 2004
Most penalties in a match — 6
Blackheath away to Stourbridge on 26 February 2005
Most drop goals in a match — 1
N/A - multiple teams

Player
Most points in a match — 29
 Jonathan Davies for Wharfedale at home to Nuneaton on 9 October 2004
Most tries in a match — 3 
N/A - multiple players
Most conversions in a match — 9
 Lee Cholewa for Harrogate at home to Bracknell on 27 November 2004
Most penalties in a match —  6
 Stephen McCashin for Blackheath away to Stourbridge on 26 February 2005
Most drop goals in a match —  1 
N/A - multiple players

Attendances
Highest — 2,000 
Doncaster at home to Manchester on 9 October 2004
Lowest — 120 (x3)
Nuneaton at home to Bracknell on 23 October 2004 and Waterloo on 13 November 2004
Bracknell at home to Esher on 20 November 2004
Highest Average Attendance — 879
Doncaster
Lowest Average Attendance — 250	
Bracknell

See also
 English Rugby Union Leagues
 English rugby union system
 Rugby union in England

References

External links
 NCA Rugby

National
National League 1 seasons